Movljane is a settlement in the Suva Reka municipality in the disputed region of Kosovo. It is around 30 km south west of Pristina and around 5 km east of Suva Reka town. It lies 715 m above sea level. It is inhabited by ethnic Albanians and Serbs; in the 1991 census, it had 487 inhabitants.

Notes

References

Villages in Suva Reka
Serbian enclaves in Kosovo